Sergey Anushavan Yaghubyan (Armenian: Սերգեյ Յաղուբյան; 16 September 1925 – 19 May 2011)  known as Sergey Yaghubyan was an Armenian politician of the Armenian Revolutionary Federation (ARF).

Sergey Yaghubyan  was born with the name Frounze  (Armenian: Ֆրունզ 16 September 1925) in Horom, Shirak Province of Armenia, to Armenian immigrants Anushavan Yaghubyan (from Eleşkirt district of Ağrı Province in Turkey) and Khanoum Yaghubyan.

He was a member of the Armenian Revolutionary Federation Central Committee from 13 May 1940  and a member of the ARF Bureau.

References

2011 deaths
1925 births
Armenian Revolutionary Federation politicians
Soviet Armenians